Big Review TV was a company founded by Brandon Evertz, in May 2013.

Overview 
Big Review TV operated in the media and technology space providing online video content, video reviews and online marketing services for consumers and small and medium enterprises and businesses in Australia, the United Kingdom, and the United States. It offered a video-driven review platform that integrated video; Internet, social media, a mobile phone video review application, and TV review shows.

History 
Big Review TV was allegedly started from a $500 loan by Brandon Evertz's father and became one of Australia's fastest growing companies. It reversed listed through a parent company on the Australian Securities exchange via Republic Gold Limited.

Voluntary administration 
Big Review TV was placed into voluntary administration to allow a restructure of the business and to preserve value for shareholders. The company could not overcome its accounting mishaps and went under shortly thereafter. A director's report in May 2018 showed that the company had a $47 million asset deficit, with secured creditors holding a $57 million claim on the company's assets.

See also
Accounting scandals
Enron scandal

https://www.afr.com/markets/equity-markets/big-un-investors-turn-dark-after-life-changing-losses-20180523-h10g3s

External links 
 Big Review TV home page

Companies formerly listed on the Australian Securities Exchange
Defunct software companies of Australia